Artur Dyson dos Santos (Lisbon, 9 January 1912 – 14 October 1985), former Portuguese footballer who played goalkeeper for Sporting and the Portugal national team.

International career 
Dyson made his debut for the national team 31 May 1931 against Belgium in a 3-2 victory in Lisbon.

External links 
 
 

1912 births
Sporting CP footballers
Portugal international footballers
Portuguese footballers
Primeira Liga players
1985 deaths
Footballers from Lisbon
Association football goalkeepers